A number of notable people have the surname O'Donnell:

Academia
Edward J. O'Donnell (1909–1986), President of Marquette University (1948–1962)
Guillermo O'Donnell (1936–2011), Argentinian academic
Hugo O'Donnell, Duke of Tetuan (born 1948), Spanish naval historian, and Knight of Malta
James J. O'Donnell (born 1950), classical scholar and Provost of Georgetown University
Patrick Denis O'Donnell (1922–2005), Irish military historian

Entertainment and the arts
Cathy O'Donnell (1923–1970), American actress, originally Ann Steely
Chris O'Donnell (born 1970), American actor
Daniel O'Donnell (singer) (born 1961), Irish musician
Heather O'Donnell, American concert pianist
James O'Donnell (organist) (born 1961), organist, choral conductor and academic teacher, Westminster Abbey
Jamie-Lee O'Donnell, Irish actress
Keir O'Donnell (born 1978), Australian actor living in Los Angeles
Lawrence O'Donnell  (born 1951), American television host of The Last Word with Lawrence O'Donnell, political analyst and writer
Martin O'Donnell (born 1955), Audio Director for Bungie
Michael O'Donnell (1928–2019), British physician and broadcaster
Roger O'Donnell (born 1955), English musician and keyboardist of The Cure
Rosie O'Donnell (born 1962), American actress and television hostess
Steve O'Donnell (born 1954), American television scriptwriter
Steven O'Donnell (Australian actor) (born 1980), Australian television presenter and actor

Characters
 Wolf O'Donnell, a character in Nintendo's Star Fox video game series

Journalism
Kelly O'Donnell (born 1965), American journalist
Norah O'Donnell (born 1974), American journalist

Literature
Elliott O'Donnell (1872–1965), Irish author
Jessie Fremont O'Donnell (1860–1897), American writer
John Francis O'Donnell (1837–1874), Irish journalist and poet
Lisa O'Donnell, Scottish writer
Mietta O'Donnell (1950–2001), Australian restaurateur and food writer
Peadar O'Donnell (1893–1986), Irish political activist and writer
Peter O'Donnell (1920–2010), British fiction writer
Terence O'Donnell (1924–2011), American writer

Medicine
Barry O'Donnell (1926–2019), Irish surgeon
Pacho O'Donnell (born 1941), Argentinian psychoanalyst

Nobility
Calvagh O'Donnell (died 1566), The O'Donnell, 22nd Chieftain, and Lord of Tyrconnell
Cathbarr O'Donnell (died 1608), a member of the O'Donnell dynasty
Donnell O'Donnell (died 1590)
Enrique O'Donnell, Conde del Abisbal (1769–1834), Irish-Spanish nobleman, Spanish general
Hugh O'Donnell, 2nd Earl of Tyrconnell (1606–1642)
José O'Donnell (1722–1787), Irish-Spanish nobleman, Spanish general
Manus O'Donnell (died 1564), The O'Donnell, 21st Chieftain, King of Tyrconnell, and biographer of St Colmcille
Maximilian Karl Lamoral O'Donnell (1812–1895), Hiberno-Austrian Count, saved life of Emperor Franz Josef I
Niall Garve O'Donnell (1569–1626)
Red Hugh O'Donnell (1572–1601), The O'Donnell, 24th Chieftain, Prince of Tyrconnell
Rory O'Donnell, 1st Earl of Tyrconnell (1575–1608)

Politics
Christine O'Donnell (born 1969), American  politician and social and political commentator
Daniel O'Donnell (politician) (born 1960), American legislator from the state of New York 
Francis Martin O'Donnell (born 1954), Irish UN diplomat and Knight of Malta
Frank Hugh O'Donnell (1846–1916), nationalist MP
Gus O'Donnell (born 1952), Baron, Cabinet Secretary (chief civil servant), British Government
Hugh Roe O'Donnell (1572–1602), Irish Rebel
James O'Donnell (politician) (1840–1915), American politician from Michigan
John O'Donnell (Irish politician, born 1980s), nationally known figure
Kenneth O'Donnell (1924–1977), American politician
Leopoldo O'Donnell (1809–1867), 1st Duke of Tetuan, and former Prime Minister of Spain
Peter O'Donnell (born 1924), Texas Republican politician and businessman
Phil O'Donnell (1932–1982), IRA volunteer from Derry
Thomas O'Donnell (Irish nationalist politician) (1871–1943), Irish Nationalist MP for West Kerry
Thomas E. O'Donnell (draft opponent), activist in the New York Draft Riots
Tom O'Donnell (politician) (1926–2020), Irish politician

Religion
Cletus F. O'Donnell (1917–1992), American Roman Catholic bishop
Edmund O'Donnell, Irish Jesuit
Edward Joseph O'Donnell (1931–2009), American Roman Catholic bishop
James O'Donnell (organist) (born 1961), current organist of Westminster Abbey
Patrick O'Donnell (1856–1927), Cardinal Archbishop of Armagh

Sport
Andy O'Donnell (1925–2019), American basketball player
Carter O'Donnell (born 1998), American football player
Conor O'Donnell, at least three Gaelic footballers
Danny O'Donnell (born 1986), English footballer
Ethan O'Donnell (born 1996/7), Irish Gaelic footballer
Gary O'Donnell (born 1965), Australian-rules footballer
Luke O'Donnell (born 1980), Australian International Rugby League player
Martin O'Donnell (born 1986), English professional snooker player
Neil O'Donnell (born 1966), former Pittsburgh Steelers quarterback
Niall O'Donnell (born 1998), Irish Gaelic footballer
Phil O'Donnell (1972–2007), Scottish footballer
Scott O'Donell (born 1967), Australian football (soccer) player
Sean O'Donnell (born 1971), Canadian hockey player

Other professions
Denis O'Donnell (1875–1933), Irish dairy innovator and entrepreneur
Emmett O'Donnell, Jr. (1906–1971), U.S. Air Force general
Myles O'Donnell, Chicago mobster during the Prohibition era

Surnames
Lists of people by surname
Anglicised Irish-language surnames
Surnames of Irish origin